Hypotia khorgosalis is a species of snout moth in the genus Hypotia. It was described by Ragonot in 1891, and is known from China.

References

Moths described in 1891
Hypotiini